Hemus may refer to:

 Hemus (crab), a genus of spider crabs
 Haemus, a Thracian king in Greek mythology 
 Haemus Mons, ancient name of the Balkan Mountains (Bulgaria)
 Hemus Air, a Bulgarian airline
 Hemus (publishing house), a Bulgarian publishing house
 Hemus motorway, designated A2, a partially built motorway in Bulgaria
 Hemus Peak, a peak on Livingston Island, in the South Shetland Islands of Antarctica

People with the surname
 Solly Hemus (1923–2017), an American professional baseball infielder, manager, and coach in Major League Baseball
 Geraldine Hemus (1876–1969), a New Zealand lawyer
 Lancelot Hemus (1881–1933) was a New Zealand cricketer